Georgina Ann Stirling (April 3, 1867 – April 23, 1935) was a Newfoundland opera singer, known by her stage name Marie Toulinquet. Born in Twillingate, in Newfoundland, she became a world-renowned prima donna soprano who played in opera houses throughout Europe and United States. She was Newfoundland's first opera singer and became known as The Nightingale of the North.

Life and career

Stirling is the daughter of Ann (Peyton) and William Stirling.  She was educated at Twillingate and Toronto and went on to study singing in Paris, Italy and Germany. She had taken the stage name "Toulinguet" which was the original French name for Twillingate. At the age of fifteen she played as a church organist in her hometown and early in her career had been instrumental in the formation of the Dorcas Society.

While in Paris, Stirling had studied under the tutorship of Madame Mathilde Marchesi where she was discovered by a Milan opera company. She toured and accepted engagements with many operas such as the Opera Company of New York City, the Boston Harmony Orchestral Society and the Scalchi Opera Company. At the peak of her career she had developed a throat ailment that cut her singing career short. She eventually made a comeback as concert artist.

Stirling had returned to her hometown of Twillingate to live with her sister Rose where she eventually died on April 23, 1935 Easter Sunday.  Her grave is located at Snelling Cove and happens to overlook the ocean. A monument created as her grave marker was erected in 1964.

See also

List of Canadian musicians
Music of Newfoundland and Labrador
List of Newfoundland songs

References

External links
Nightingale of the North-Georgina Stirling, Virtual Museum of Canada
"Nightingale of the North" by Amy Louise Peyton
Heritage Newfoundland Archives

1866 births
1935 deaths
People from Newfoundland (island)
Musicians from Newfoundland and Labrador
Canadian operatic sopranos
19th-century Canadian women opera singers
20th-century Canadian women opera singers
Deaths from cancer in Newfoundland and Labrador